The 2022–23 curling season began in June 2022 and will end in May 2023.

Note: In events with two genders, the men's tournament winners will be listed before the women's tournament winners.

World Curling Federation events

Source:

Championships

Qualification events

Other events

Curling Canada events

Source:

Championships

Invitationals

Provincial and territorial playdowns

National championships

Australia

Brazil

China
Chinese Curling League

Chinese Curling Championships

Czech Republic

Denmark

England

Estonia

()

Japan

Latvia

()

Netherlands

New Zealand

Norway

()

Russia

Scotland

South Korea

Sweden

Switzerland

United States

(source for upcoming events)

Tour events

Grand Slam events in bold.
Note: More events may be posted as time progresses.

Teams
See: List of teams in the 2022–23 curling season

World Curling Tour sanctioned events

Men's events

Source:

Women's events

Source:

Mixed doubles events

Source:

Other events

Men's events

Source:

Women's events

Source:

Mixed doubles events

Source:

WCF rankings

Notes

References

2022 in curling
2023 in curling
Seasons in curling
Curling